The Seebek is a small stream in Hamburg, Germany, which flows from the lake of the Bramfelder See in a southerly direction.

After about 3 kilometres it discharges into the Osterbek. The stream is also known locally as the Grenzbach ('border stream' - it forms the boundary between Bramfeld and Barmbek in Hamburg) has a good water quality. In the 1980s the streambed was largely returned to a near-natural condition after it had previously largely degenerated into a concrete drainage ditch. Today the stream provides an outstanding habitat for many small animals. The process of renaturisation had not finished; since March 2005 NABU has run Project Eisvogel (Eisvogel = 'kingfisher') especially to improve the water flow through the Seebek.

Since 1959 Seebek has also been the name of an Alster steamer.

See also
List of rivers of Hamburg

Rivers of Hamburg
Rivers of Germany